= Sueño Verde =

Sueño Verde was a three-day festival with music, performance, art, circus and workshops covering many aspects of ecology. It took place in Boñar, León, north west Spain.

The aim of the festival was to provide a diverse range of world-class entertainment while promoting alternative energy, sustainability, recycling and responsible use of resources. The festival used a variety of alternative energy sources, including solar power, wind power and a vegetable oil generator.

The first Sueño Verde took place in May 2005 in the eco village Matavenero.
